Dreams is the sixth studio album by Norwegian band Fra Lippo Lippi.

When their 1989 album The Colour Album generated mediocre sales , the band parted ways with their Swedish label The Record Station and were considering breaking up. Instead, they decided to write songs for a new album. In 1991, the band recorded the songs in founder Rune Kristoffersen's basement before sending the tapes to Stockholm, Sweden, for record producer Kaj Erixon (who worked on the band's 1985 album Songs) to mix them. The album was released by Sonet Records in Norway, Polystar Records in Japan and OctoArts International (now EMI Records Philippines) in the Philippines.

Dreams was a moderate hit in the Philippines, with the song "Stitches and Burns" receiving constant airplay on radio. It would be Kristoffersen's final studio album with the band, and the band's last original recording for over a decade.

Track listing

 "Thief in Paradise"
 "Living in a Crazy World"
 "Stitches and Burns"
 "Not Invited"
 "Heart of the Matter"
 "Naive"
 "One World"
 "Wonderful Day"
 "Dreams"

The Japanese release has "Stitches and Burns" as track #6 and "Naive" as track #3.

Personnel
Rune Kristoffersen - Bass, keyboards
Per Øystein Sørensen - Vocals, keyboards

with

Tom Kåre Pettersen - Guitars
Ottar Nesje - Drums

References

Fra Lippo Lippi (band) albums
1992 albums